Forrest Martin Griffith (February 15, 1928 – December 12, 2007) was an American football halfback who played two seasons with the New York Giants of the National Football League (NFL). He was drafted by the Giants in the fifth round of the 1950 NFL Draft. He played college football at the University of Kansas and attended Lee's Summit High School in Lee's Summit, Missouri.

References

External links
Just Sports Stats

1928 births
2007 deaths
Players of American football from Missouri
American football halfbacks
Kansas Jayhawks football players
New York Giants players
People from Lee's Summit, Missouri